This is the list of the number-one singles of the 1Xtra Chart during the 2010s, .

Number-one singles

By artist
, eight artists have spent five or more weeks at the top of the 1Xtra Chart so far during the 2010s. The totals below include only credited performances, and do not include appearances as members of groups such as The Black Eyed Peas.

By record label
, eight record labels have spent six or more weeks at the top of the 1Xtra Chart so far during the 2010s.

See also

List of UK Singles Chart number ones of the 2010s
Lists of UK R&B Singles Chart number ones

Notes

References

External links
1Xtra Singles Top 40 at the Official Charts Company
The Official 1Xtra Chart at BBC Radio 1

2010s in British music
1Xtra
1Xtra